Lachesilla merzi is a species of Psocoptera from the Lachesillidae family that is endemic to Spain.

References

Lachesillidae
Insects described in 1989
Endemic fauna of Spain